Rita Campbell is an American politician and a former Republican member of the Wyoming House of Representatives representing District 34 from 2011 to 2017. She did not seek re-election in 2016.

Education
Campbell attended Mount Mary College (now Mount Mary University).

Elections
2014: Campbell won the August 19, 2014 Republican Primary with 892 votes (42.4%), and was unopposed for the November 4, 2014 General election.
2012: Campbell won the August 21, 2012 Republican Primary with 1,020 votes (56.4%), and was unopposed for the November 6, 2012 General election, winning with 3,797 votes.
2010: When Republican Representative Frank Philp retired and left the District 34 seat open, Campbell won the four-way August 17, 2010 Republican Primary with 908 votes (41.3%), and won the November 2, 2010 General election with 2,727 votes (78.6%) against Libertarian candidate Richard Brubaker, who had sought the seat in 2006 and 2008.

References

External links
Official page at the Wyoming Legislature
 

Place of birth missing (living people)
Year of birth missing (living people)
Living people
Republican Party members of the Wyoming House of Representatives
People from Fremont County, Wyoming
Women state legislators in Wyoming
21st-century American politicians
21st-century American women politicians